Bononia may refer to :

 the Roman name of several populated places and jurisdictions. 
 Banoštor, a village in Serbia
 Bologna, a city in Italy
 Boulogne-sur-Mer, a city in France
 Vidin, ancient name of the city in Bulgaria

 Other
 Bononia University Press, the publisher of the University of Bologna
 , a village in Poland
 Bononia (titular see), the ancient bishopric of Vidin, now a Latin Catholic titular see
 Bononia Cove, Antarctica, a geographical feature named after Bononia, Bulgaria
 Bononia (moth), a genus in the family Noctuidae
 361 Bononia, a large main-belt asteroid

See also